Denmark Vesey (also Telemaque) (  July 2, 1822) was an early 18th century free Black and community leader in Charleston, South Carolina, who was accused and convicted of planning a major slave revolt in 1822. Although the alleged plot was discovered before it could be realized, its potential scale stoked the fears of the antebellum planter class that led to increased restrictions on both slaves and free blacks.

Likely born into slavery in St. Thomas, Vesey was enslaved by Captain Joseph Vesey in Bermuda for some time before being brought to Charleston. There, Vesey won a lottery and purchased his freedom around the age of 32. He had a good business and a family, but was unable to buy his first wife Beck and their children out of slavery. Vesey worked as a carpenter and became active in the Second Presbyterian Church. In 1818 he helped found an independent African Methodist Episcopal (AME) congregation in the city, today known as Mother Emanuel. The congregation began with the support of white clergy, and with over 1,848 members rapidly became the second-largest AME congregation in the nation.

In the summer of 1822, Vesey allegedly used his substantial influence among the black community to plan a major slave revolt. According to the accusations, Vesey and his followers planned to kill slaveholders in Charleston, liberate the slaves, and sail to the newly independent black republic of Haiti for refuge. By some contemporary accounts, the revolt would have involved thousands of slaves in the city as well as others who lived on nearby plantations. City officials sent a militia to arrest the plot's leaders and many suspected followers before the rising could begin, and no white people were killed or injured. Vesey and five slaves were rapidly judged guilty by the secret proceedings of a city-appointed court and executed by hanging on July 2, 1822. Vesey was about 55 years old. In later proceedings, some 30 additional followers were also executed. Another group, including his son Sandy, were convicted of conspiracy and deported from the United States. City authorities ordered that Vesey's church should be razed and its minister was expelled from the city.

Early life
Manuscript transcripts of testimony at the 1822 court proceedings in Charleston, South Carolina, and its report after the events constitute the chief source of documentation about Denmark Vesey's life. The court judged Vesey guilty of conspiring to launch a slave rebellion and executed him by hanging.

The court reported that he was born into slavery about 1767 in St. Thomas, at the time a colony of Denmark. Captain Joseph Vesey renamed him Telemaque; historian Douglas Egerton suggests that Vesey could have been of Coromantee (an Akan-speaking people) origin. Biographer David Robertson also suggests that Telemaque may have been of Mandé origin.

Telemaque was purchased around the age of 14 by Joseph Vesey, a Bermudian sea captain and slave merchant. Little is known of the life of Joseph Vesey, though the Vesey family is one of some influence in Bermuda, more recently producing notable businessmen and politicians including master mariner Captain Nathaniel Arthur Vesey (1841–1911; MCP for Devonshire Parish), and his sons, Sir Nathaniel Henry Peniston Vesey, CBE (known as Henry Vesey; 1901–1996, MCP for Smith's Parish) and John Ernest Peniston Vesey, CBE (1903–1993), MP for Southampton Parish, and grandson Ernest Winthrop Peniston Vesey (1926–1994). After a time, Vesey sold the youth to a planter in French Saint-Domingue (present-day Haiti). When the youth was found to suffer epileptic fits, Captain Vesey took him back and returned his purchase price to the former master. Biographer Egerton found no evidence of Denmark Vesey having epilepsy later in life, and he suggests that Denmark may have faked the seizures in order to escape the particularly brutal conditions on Saint-Domingue.

Telemaque worked as a personal assistant for Joseph Vesey and served Vesey as an interpreter in slave trading, a job which required him to travel to Bermuda (an archipelago on the same latitude as Charleston, South Carolina, but nearest to Cape Hatteras, North Carolina, and originally settled as part of colonial Virginia by the Virginia Company) for long periods of time, and as a result, he was known to be fluent in French and Spanish as well as English. Following the Revolutionary War, the captain retired from his nautical career (including slave trading), settling in Charleston, South Carolina, which had been settled from Bermuda in 1669. Telemaque had learned to read and write by the time he and Vesey settled in Charleston.

Carolina was split in 1669 into two provinces, the southern Clarendon province, that included Charleston, and the northern Albemarle province, which became the separate colonies of South Carolina and North Carolina in 1712. Charleston was a continental hub that was connected to Bermuda's thriving merchant shipping trade. The trading center of the Low country's rice and indigo plantations, the city had a majority-slave population and thriving port. In 1796, Captain Vesey wed Mary Clodner, a wealthy "free East Indian woman", and the couple used Telemaque as a domestic at Mary's plantation The Grove, just outside Charleston on the Ashley River.

Freedom
On November 9, 1799, Telemaque won $1500 in a city lottery. At the age of 32, he bought his freedom for $600 from Vesey. He took the surname Vesey and the given name of 'Denmark,' after the nation ruling his birthplace of St. Thomas. Denmark Vesey began working as an independent carpenter and built up his own business. By this time he had married Beck, an enslaved woman. Their children were born into slavery under the principle of partus sequitur ventrem, by which children of a slave mother took her status. Vesey worked to gain freedom for his family; he tried to buy his wife and their children, but her master would not sell her. This meant their future children would also be born into slavery.

Along with other slaves, Vesey had belonged to the Second Presbyterian church and chafed against its restrictions on black members.

In 1818, after becoming a freedman, he was among founders of a congregation on what was known as the "Bethel circuit" of the African Methodist Episcopal Church (AME Church). This had been organized in Philadelphia, Pennsylvania in 1816 as the first independent black denomination in the United States.

The AME Church in Charleston was supported by leading white clergy. In 1818 white authorities briefly ordered the church closed, for violating slave code rules that prohibited black congregations from holding worship services after sunset. The church attracted 1848 members by 1818, making it the second-largest AME church in the nation. City officials always worried about slaves in groups; they closed the church again for a time in 1821, as the City Council warned that its classes were becoming a "school for slaves" (under the slave code, slaves were prohibited from being taught to read). Vesey was reported as a leader in the congregation, drawing from the Bible to inspire hope for freedom.

Background
By 1708, the population of the colony of South Carolina was majority enslaved, reflecting the numerous African slaves imported to the state as laborers on the rice and indigo plantations. Exports of these commodity crops, and cotton from the offshore Sea Islands, produced the wealth enjoyed by South Carolina's planters. This elite class controlled the legislature for decades after the American Revolution. The state, the Lowcountry and city of Charleston had a majority of the population who were slaves of African descent. By the late 18th century, slaves were increasingly "country born," that is, native to the United States. They were generally considered more tractable than newly enslaved Africans. Connections of kinship and personal relations extended between slaves in the city of Charleston and those on plantations in the Lowcountry, just as those connections existed among the planter class, many of whom had residences (and domestic slaves) in both places.

From 1791 to 1803 the Haitian Revolution of slaves and free people of color on Saint-Domingue had embroiled the French colony in violence; blacks gained independence and created the republic of Haiti in 1804. Many whites and free people of color had fled to Charleston and other port cities as refugees during the uprisings, and brought their slaves with them. In the city, the new slaves were referred to as "French Negroes". Their accounts of the revolts and its success spread rapidly among Charleston's slaves. The free people of color occupied a place between the mass of blacks and the minority of whites in Charleston.

In the early 1800s, the state legislature had voted to reopen its ports to importing slaves from Africa. This decision was highly controversial and opposed by many planters in the Lowcountry, who feared the disruptive influence of new Africans on their slaves. Planters in Upland areas were developing new plantations based on short-staple cotton and needed many workers, so the state approved resumption of the Atlantic trade. The profitability of this type of cotton had been made possible by the invention of the cotton gin just before the turn of the 19th century. From 1804 to 1808, Charleston merchants imported some 75,000 slaves, more than the total brought to South Carolina in the 75 years before the Revolution. Some of these slaves were sold to the Uplands and other areas, but many of the new Africans were held in Charleston and on nearby Lowcountry plantations.

Planning

Even after gaining his freedom, Vesey continued to identify and socialize with many slaves. He became increasingly set on helping his new friends break from the bonds of slavery. In 1819, Vesey became inspired by the congressional debates over the status of Missouri, and how it should be admitted to the Union, since slavery appeared to be under attack.

Vesey developed followers among the mostly enslaved blacks in the Second Presbyterian Church and then the independent AME African Church. The latter's congregation represented more than 10% of the blacks in the city. They resented the harassment by city officials. Economic conditions in the Charleston area became difficult since an economic decline affected the city. In the year of 1821, Vesey and a few slaves began to conspire and plan a revolt. In order for the revolt to be successful, Vesey had to recruit others and strengthen his army. Because Denmark Vesey was a lay preacher, when he had recruited enough followers, he would review plans of the revolt with his followers at his home during religious classes. Vesey inspired slaves by connecting their potential freedom to the biblical story of the Exodus, and God's delivery of the children of Israel from Egyptian slavery.

In his 50s, Vesey was a well-established carpenter with his own business. He reportedly planned the insurrection to take place on Bastille Day, July 14, 1822. This date was notable in association with the French Revolution, whose victors had abolished slavery in Saint-Domingue. News of the plan was said to be spread among thousands of blacks throughout Charleston and for tens of miles through plantations along the Carolina coast. (Both the city and county populations were majority black; Charleston in 1820 had a population of 14,127 blacks and 10,653 whites.) Within the black population was a growing upper class of free people of color or mulattos, some of whom were slaveholders. Vesey generally aligned with slaves.

Vesey held numerous secret meetings and eventually gained the support of both slaves and free blacks throughout the city and countryside who were willing to fight for their freedom. He was said to organize thousands of slaves who pledged to participate in his planned insurrection. By using intimate family ties between those in the countryside and the city, Vesey created an extensive network of supporters.

His plan was first, to make a coordinated attack on the Charleston Meeting Street Arsenal. Once they secured these weapons, these Freedom Fighters planned to commandeer ships from the harbor and sail to Haiti, possibly with Haitian help. Vesey and his followers also planned to kill white slaveholders throughout the city, as had been done in Haiti, and liberate the slaves. According to records of the French Consulate in Charleston, his group was reported to have numerous members who were "French Negroes," slaves brought from Saint-Domingue by refugee masters.

Failed uprising
Due to the vast number of slaves who knew about the planned uprising, Vesey feared that word of the plot would get out. Vesey reportedly advanced the date of the insurrection to June 16. Beginning in May, two slaves opposed to Vesey's scheme, George Wilson and Joe LaRoche, gave the first specific testimony about a coming uprising to Charleston officials, saying a "rising" was planned for July 14. George Wilson was a mixed-race slave who was deeply loyal to his master. The testimonies of these two men confirmed an earlier report coming from another slave named Peter Prioleau. Though officials didn't believe the less specific testimony of Prioleau, they did believe Wilson and LaRoche due to their unimpeachable reputations with their masters. With their testimony, the city launched a search for conspirators.

Joe LaRoche had originally planned to support the rising and brought the slave Rolla Bennett to discuss plans with George Wilson, his close friend. Wilson had to decide whether to join the conspiracy described by Bennett or tell his master that there was a plot in the making. Wilson refused to join the conspiracy and urged both Laroche and Bennett to end their involvement in the plans. Wilson convinced LaRoche that they must tell his master to prevent the conspiracy from being acted out.

The Mayor James Hamilton was told, and he organized a citizens' militia, putting the city on alert. White militias and groups of armed men patrolled the streets daily for weeks until many suspects were arrested by the end of June, including 55-year-old Denmark Vesey. As suspects were arrested, they were held in the Charleston Workhouse until the newly appointed Court of Magistrates and Freeholders heard evidence against them. The Workhouse was also the place where punishment was applied to slaves for their masters, and likely where Plot suspects were abused, or threatened with abuse or death before giving testimony to the Court. The suspects were allowed visits by ministers; Dr. Benjamin Palmer visited Vesey after he was sentenced to death, and Vesey told the minister that he would die for a "glorious cause".

Court of Magistrates and Freeholders
As leading suspects were rounded up by the militia ordered by Intendant/Mayor James Hamilton, the Charleston City Council voted to authorize a Court of Magistrates and Freeholders to evaluate suspects and determine crimes. Tensions in the city were at a height, and many residents had doubts about actions taken during the widespread fears and quick rush to judgment. Soon after the Court began its sessions, in secret and promising secrecy to all witnesses, Supreme Court Justice William Johnson published an article in the local paper recounting an incident of a feared insurrection of 1811. He noted that a slave was mistakenly executed in the case, hoping to suggest caution in the Vesey affair. He was well respected, having been appointed as Justice by President Thomas Jefferson in 1804, but his article appeared to produce a defensive reaction, with white residents defending the Court and the militancy of city forces.

From June 17, the day after the purported insurrection was to begin, to June 28, the day after the court adjourned, officials arrested 31 suspects and in greater numbers as the month went on. The Court took secret testimony about suspects in custody and accepted evidence against men not yet charged. Historians acknowledge that some witnesses testified under threat of death or torture, but Robertson believes that their affirming accounts appeared to provide details of a plan for rebellion.

Newspapers were nearly silent while the Court conducted its proceedings. While bickering with Johnson, the Court first published its judgment of guilt of Denmark Vesey and five black slaves; sentencing them to death. The six men were executed by hanging on July 2.  None of the six had confessed and each proclaimed his innocence to the end. Their deaths quieted some of the city residents' fears, and the tumult in Charleston about the planned revolt began to die down. Officials made no arrests in the next three days, as if wrapping up their business.

Concerns about proceedings
Learning that the proceedings were largely conducted in secret, with defendants often unable to confront their accusers or hear testimony against them, Governor Thomas Bennett, Jr. had concerns about the legality of the Court, as did his brother-in-law Justice Johnson. The owners of accused slaves and their attorneys, however, were allowed to attend the proceedings. Bennett had served almost continuously in the state legislature since 1804, including four years as Speaker of the House. He did not take any action at first, because four of his household slaves were among those accused in the first group with Vesey, and three of these men were executed with the leader on July 2.

Bennett consulted in writing with Robert Y. Hayne, Attorney General for the state, expressing his concerns about the conduct of the Court. He believed that it was wrong for defendants to be unable to confront their accusers, yet be subject to execution. Hayne responded that, under the state's constitution, slaves were not protected by the rights available to freemen of habeas corpus and the Magna Carta. Vesey, however, was a free man.

Further arrests and convictions
On July 1, an editorial in the Courier defended the work of the Court. After that, in July the cycle of arrests and judgments sped up, and the pool of suspects was greatly expanded. As noted by historian Michael P. Johnson, most blacks were arrested and charged after the first group of hangings on July 2; this was after the actions of the Court had been criticized by both Justice William Johnson and  Governor Bennett. The Court recorded that they divided the suspects into groups: one was those who "exhibited energy and activity"; if convicted, these were executed. Other men who seemed simply to "yield their acquiescence" to participating, were deported if convicted. Over the course of five weeks, the Court ordered the arrest of a total of 131 black men, charging them with conspiracy.

In July the pace of arrests and charges more than doubled, as if authorities were intent to prove there had been a large insurrection that needed controlling. But, the court "found it difficult to get conclusive evidence." It noted in its report covering the second round of court proceedings, that three men sentenced to death implicated "scores of others" when they were promised leniency in punishment.

In total, the courts convicted 67 men of conspiracy and hanged 35, including Vesey, in July 1822. A total of 31 men were deported, 27 reviewed and acquitted, and 38 questioned and released.

Vesey's family
Vesey had at least one child, Denmark Vesey, Jr., who remained in Charleston. He later married Hannah Nelson. The remainder of Vesey's family was also affected by the crisis and Court proceedings. His enslaved son Sandy Vesey was arrested, judged to have been part of the conspiracy, and included among those deported from the country, probably to Cuba. Vesey's third wife, Susan, later emigrated to Liberia, which the American Colonization Society had established as a colony for freed American slaves and other free blacks. Two other sons, Randolph Vesey and Robert Vesey, both children of Beck, Denmark's first wife, survived past the end of the American Civil War and were emancipated. Robert helped rebuild Charleston's African Methodist Episcopal Church in 1865, and also attended the transfer of power when US officials took control again at Fort Sumter.

White involvement
On October 7, 1822, Judge Elihu Bay convicted four white men for a misdemeanor in inciting slaves to insurrection during the Denmark Vesey slave conspiracy. These four white men were William Allen, John Igneshias, Andrew S. Rhodes, and Jacob Danders.  The men were sentenced to varied fines and reasonably short jail time. Historians have found no evidence that any of these men were known abolitionists; they do not seem to have had contact with each other or any of the plotters of the rebellion. William Allen received twelve months in prison and a $1,000 fine, which was the harshest punishment of the four. When tried in court, Allen admitted to trying to help the slave conspiracy, but said that he did so because he was promised a large sum of money for his services. Reports from the judge show that the court believed that Allen was motivated by greed rather than any sympathy for the slaves.

The other white conspirators' punishments were far more lenient than that of Allen. John Igneshias was sentenced to a one hundred dollar fine and three months in prison, as was Jacob Danders. Igneshias was found guilty of inciting slaves to insurrection, but Danders was charged for saying that he "disliked everything in Charleston, but the Negroes and the sailors." Danders had said this publicly after the plot had been revealed; city officials thought his comment suspicious. Danders was found guilty for showing sympathy to the slaves who had been caught ostensibly as part of the conspiracy. The final white defendant, Andrew S. Rhodes, received a sentence of six months and a five hundred dollar fine; there was less evidence against him than any of the other whites.

White residents of Charleston feared there could be more whites who wanted to help blacks fight against slavery. They were already concerned about the growing abolitionist movement in the North, which spread its message through the mails and via antislavery mariners, both white and black, who came ashore in the city. Judge Bay sentenced the four white men as a warning to any other whites who might think of supporting slave rebels. He also was pushing state lawmakers to strengthen laws against both mariners and free blacks in South Carolina in general, and anyone supporting slave rebellions, in particular. Judge Bay thought these four white men were spared from hanging only because of a "statutory oversight." The convictions of these men enabled some white men of the pro-slavery establishment to believe that their slaves would not stage rebellions without the manipulation of "alien agitators or local free people of color."

Aftermath
In August both Governor Bennett and Mayor Hamilton published accounts of the insurrection and Court proceedings. Bennett downplayed the danger posed by the alleged crisis, and argued that the Court's executions and lack of due process damaged the state's reputation. But Hamilton captured the public with his 46-page account, which became the "received version" of a narrowly avoided bloodbath and citizens saved by the city's and Court's zeal and actions. Hamilton attributed the insurrection to the influence of black Christianity and the AME African Church, an increase in slave literacy, and misguided paternalism by masters toward slaves. In October the Court issued its Report, shaped by Hamilton.

Lacy K. Ford notes that:
the most important fact about the Report was (and remains) that it tells the story that Hamilton and the Court wanted told. It shaped the public perception of events, and it was certainly intended to do just that. As such, it makes important points about the Vesey Court’s agenda, regardless of the larger historical truth of the document’s claims about the alleged insurrection and accused insurrectionists.Ford noted that Hamilton and the Court left a major gap in their conclusions about the reasons for the slave revolt. The importation of thousands of African slaves to the city and region by the early 1800s was completely missing as a factor, although fears of slave revolt had been one of the major reasons expressed for opposition to the imports. He suggests this factor was omitted because that political battle was over; instead, Hamilton identified reasons for the rising that could be prevented or controlled by legislation which he proposed.

Governor Bennett's criticism continued, and he made a separate report to the legislature in the fall of 1822 (he was in his last year in office). He accused the Charleston City Council of usurping its authority by setting up the Court, which he said violated law by holding secret proceedings, with no protections for the defendants. The court took testimony under "pledges of inviolable secrecy" and "convicted [the accused] and "sentenced [them] to death without their seeing the persons, or hearing the voices of those, who testified to their guilt." Open sessions could have allowed the potential for the court to distinguish among varying accounts.

Believing that "black religion" contributed to the uprising, and believing that several AME Church officials had participated in the plot, Charleston officials ordered the large congregation to be dispersed and the building razed. Church trustees sold the lumber, hoping to rebuild in later years. Rev. Morris Brown of the church was forced out of the state; he later became a bishop of the national AME Church. No independent black church was established in the city again until after the Civil War, but many black worshippers met secretly. In the 21st century, the congregations of Emanuel AME Church and the Morris Brown AME Church carry on the legacy of the first AME Church in Charleston.

In 1820 the state legislature had already restricted manumissions by requiring that any act of manumission (for an individual only) had to be approved by both houses of the legislature. This discouraged planters from freeing their slaves, and made it almost impossible for slaves to gain freedom independently, even in cases where an individual or family member could pay a purchase price. After the Vesey Plot, the legislature further restricted the movement of free blacks and free people of color; if one left the state for any reason, that person could not return. In addition, it required each free black to have documented white "guardians" to vouch for their character.

The legislature also passed the Negro Seamen Act in 1822, requiring free black sailors on ships that docked in Charleston to be imprisoned in the city jail for the period that their ships were in port. This was to prevent them from interacting with and influencing slaves and other Blacks in the city. This act was ruled unconstitutional in Federal court, as it violated international treaties between the US and Britain. The state's right to imprison free black sailors became one of the issues in the confrontation between South Carolina and the Federal government over states' rights.

Following passage of the Seaman's Act, the white minority of Charleston organized the South Carolina Association, essentially to take over enforcement in the city of control of slaves and free blacks.  As part of this, in late 1822 the City petitioned the General Assembly "to establish a competent force to act as a municipal guard for the protection of the City of Charleston and its vicinity."  The General Assembly agreed and appropriated funds to erect "suitable buildings for an Arsenal, for the deposit of the arms of the State, and a Guard House, and for the use of the municipal guard" or militia. The South Carolina State Arsenal, which became known as the Citadel, was completed in 1829; by then white fears of insurrection had subsided for a time. Rather than establish the municipal guard authorized in the act, the State and city entered into an agreement with the US War Department to garrison the Citadel from those soldiers stationed at Fort Moultrie

Historical debate
The Court published its report in 1822 as An Official Report of the Trials of Sundry Negroes ... This was the first full account, as newspaper coverage had been very restricted during the secret proceedings. In particular, the Court collected all the information available on Vesey in the last two weeks of his life and eight weeks following his hanging. Their Report has been the basis of historians' interpretations of Vesey's life and the rebellion. Since the mid-20th century, most historians have evaluated the conspiracy in terms of black resistance to slavery, with some focusing on the plot, others on the character of Vesey and his senior leaders, and others on the black unity displayed. Despite the threats of whites, few blacks confessed and few provided testimony against the leaders or each other. Philip D. Morgan notes that by keeping silent, these slaves resisted the whites and were the true heroes of the crisis.

In 1964, historian Richard Wade examined the Court's report in comparison to manuscript transcripts of the court proceedings, of which two versions exist. Based on numerous discrepancies he found, and the lack of material evidence at the time of the "trials," he suggested that the Vesey Conspiracy was mostly "angry talk," and that the plot was not well founded for action. He noted how little evidence was found for such a plot: no arms caches were discovered, no firm date appeared to have been set, and no well-organized underground apparatus was found, but both blacks and whites widely believed there was a well-developed insurrection in the works. Claiming, erroneously, that both Justice William Johnson and his brother-in-law Governor Thomas Bennett Jr. had strong doubts about the existence of a conspiracy, Wade concluded that among black and white Charleston residents, there were "strong grievances on one side and deep fears on the other," creating a basis for belief in a broad rebellion. Wade's conclusion that the conspiracy was not well formed, was criticized later by William Freehling and other historians, particularly as Wade was found to have overlooked some material.

In 2001, Michael P. Johnson criticized three histories of Vesey and the conspiracy published in 1999, based on his study of the primary documents. He suggested that historians had over-interpreted the available evidence, which was gathered at the end of Vesey's life from the testimony of witnesses under great pressure in court. He said historians too wholeheartedly accepted such witness testimony as fact, and notes specific "interpretive improvisations." For instance, historians have described Vesey's physical appearance, which was not documented at all in the court record. Free black carpenter Thomas Brown, however, who on occasion worked with Vesey, described him as a "large, stout man."

In a response to Johnson's work, Philip D. Morgan notes that in the 19th century, Vesey was once described as a mulatto or free person of color by William Gilmore Simms. Simms, however, never met Vesey and incorrectly placed him in Haiti during the 1791 revolt. Trial records, moreover, identified him as a free "black" man. Some historians from 1849 to the 1990s described him as a mulatto. Free black carpenter Thomas Brown, who knew and sometimes worked with Vesey, described him as having dark skin. Lacking substantial documentation to refute Thomas Brown's recollections, since the later 20th century historians have described him as black. Despite Brown's recollections, however, Philip Morgan suggests this transformation in ancestry represents modern sensibilities more than any evidence.

Johnson found that the two versions of the court manuscript transcripts disagreed with each other, and contained material not found in the official report of the court. He concluded that the report was an attempt by the Court to suggest that formal trials had been held, when the proceedings did not follow accepted procedures for trials and due process. Their proceedings had been held in secret and some defendants could not confront their accusers. After Vesey and the first five conspirators were executed, the Court approved the arrest of another 82 suspects in July, more than twice as many as had been arrested in June. Johnson suggested that, after public criticism, the Court was motivated to prove there was a conspiracy.

Morgan notes that two prominent men indicated concerns about the Court. In addition, he notes that Bertram Wyatt-Brown in his Southern Honor: Ethics and Behavior in the Old South (p. 402) said that prosecutions of slave revolts were typically so arbitrary that they should be considered a "communal rite" and "celebration of white solidarity", "a religious more than a normal criminal process." Morgan thinks that historians have too often ignored that warning and supports Johnson's close examination of the variations among the Vesey Court records.

Wade and Johnson suggest that Mayor James Hamilton, Jr. of Charleston may have exaggerated rumors of the conspiracy to use as a "political wedge issue" against moderate Governor Thomas Bennett Jr. in their own rivalry and efforts to attract white political support. Hamilton knew that four of Bennett's household slaves had been arrested as suspects; three men were executed on July 2 together with Vesey. Mayor Hamilton supported a militant approach to controlling slaves and believed that the paternalistic approach of improving treatment of slaves, as promoted by moderate slaveholders such as Bennett, was a mistake. He used the crisis to appeal to the legislature for laws which he had already supported, that would authorize restrictions of slaves and free blacks.

Hamilton's article and the Court Report examine a variety of reasons for the planned revolt. Extremely dependent on slavery, many Charleston residents had been alarmed about the Missouri Compromise of 1820 that restricted slavery from expansion to the western territories, feeling it threatened the future of slavery. Some local people suggested that slaves had learned about the compromise and thought they were to be emancipated. Whites blamed the AME Church, they blamed rising slave literacy, and the African slaves brought from Haiti during its Revolution. In 1822, beleaguered whites in Charleston uniformly believed that blacks had planned a large insurrection; such a scenario represented their worst fears.

Wade noted the lack of material evidence: no arms caches or documents related to the rebellion. Johnson's article provoked considerable controversy among historians. The William and Mary Quarterly invited contributions to a "Forum" on the issue, which was published in January 2002. Egerton noted that free black carpenter Thomas Brown and other blacks familiar with Vesey or the Reverend Morris Brown, the leader of the AME Church, continued to speak or write about Vesey's plot in later years, supporting conclusions that it did exist. In 2004, historian Robert Tinkler, a biographer of Mayor Hamilton, reported that he found no evidence to support Johnson's theory that Hamilton conjured the plot for political gain. Hamilton ruthlessly pursued the prosecution, Tinkler concluded, because he "believed there was indeed a Vesey plot." Ford noted that Hamilton presented those aspects of and reasons for the insurrection that enabled him to gain controls on slavery which he had wanted before the crisis.

In a 2011 article, James O'Neil Spady said that by Johnson's own criteria, the statements of witnesses George Wilson and Joe LaRoche ought to be considered credible and as evidence of a developed plot for the rising. Neither slave was coerced nor imprisoned when he testified. Each volunteered his testimony early in the investigation, and LaRoche risked making statements that the court could have construed as self-incriminating. Spady concluded that a group had been about to launch the "rising" (as they called it) when their plans were revealed. Perhaps it was of a smaller scale than in some accounts, but he believed men were ready to take action.

In 2012 Lacy K. Ford gave the keynote address to the South Carolina Historical Association; his subject was interpretation of the Vesey Plot. He said, "the balance of the evidence clearly points to the exaggeration of the plot and the misappropriation of its lessons by Hamilton, the Court, and their allies for their own political advantage." Charleston officials had a crisis in which not one white person had been killed or injured. Ford contrasted their actions to the approach of Virginia officials after the 1831 Nat Turner's Slave Rebellion, in which slaves killed tens of whites. Charleston officials said there was a large, complex and sophisticated conspiracy led by the "brilliant" Vesey; but Virginia officials downplayed Turner's revolt, stressing that he and his few followers acted alone. Ford concludes,
Enlarging the threat posed by Vesey allowed the Lowcountry white elite to disband the thriving
AME church in Charleston and launch a full-fledged, if ultimately unsuccessful, counter-attack against the insurgency. The local elite’s interpretation of the Vesey scare prepared the state for politics centered on the defense of slavery.  This agenda reinforced tendencies toward consensus latent in the Palmetto state’s body politic; tendencies easily mobilized for radicalism by perceived threats against slavery.

Legacy and honors
 The Denmark Vesey House in Charleston, although almost certainly not the historic home of Vesey, was designated a National Historic Landmark in 1976 by the Department of Interior.
 In 1976 the city of Charleston commissioned a portrait of Vesey. It was hung in the Gaillard Municipal Auditorium, but was controversial.
 From the 1990s, African-American activists in Charleston proposed erecting a memorial to Denmark Vesey, to honor his effort to overturn slavery in the city. The proposal was controversial, because many white residents did not want to memorialize a man who they considered a terrorist. Others believed that in addition to acknowledging his leadership, a memorial would also express the slave's struggles for freedom. By 2014 the changing demographics of the city and nation had changed and white objections were no longer considered important. The Denmark Vesey Monument, representing Vesey as a carpenter and holding a Bible, was erected in Hampton Park, at some distance from the main tourist areas.
 During the 2020 NFL season, Arizona Cardinals wide receiver DeAndre Hopkins wore a decal on his helmet with Vesey's name.

In popular culture 

Literature
 The title character in Harriet Beecher Stowe's novel Dred: A Tale of the Great Dismal Swamp (1855) is an escaped slave and religious zealot who aids fellow slave refugees and spends most of the novel plotting a slave rebellion. He is a composite of Denmark Vesey and Nat Turner.
 Martin Delany's serialized novel, Blake; or the Huts of America (1859–61), referred to Vesey and Nat Turner, as well as having a protagonist who plans a large-scale slave insurrection.
 Denmark Vesey is the name and basis for a character in Orson Scott Card's The Tales of Alvin Maker, an alternate history series of books set in the United States, which have been published from 1987 to 2014.
 Sue Monk Kidd's 2014 novel, The Invention of Wings, includes Denmark Vesey as a character; the slave revolt and the reaction to it is a major plot point. The novel perpetuates the myths that Vesey practiced polygamy, and that he was hanged alone from a large tree in Charleston.
 Denmark Vesey is spoken about in John Jakes' historical novel Charleston (2002).

Theatre
 Dorothy Heyward's drama Set My People Free (1948) refers to Vesey's life.
 After Denmark, a play by David Robson, is a 21st-century exploration of the historical Denmark Vesey.

Radio
 A CBS Radio Workshop drama written by Richard Durham, Sweet Cherries in Charleston, broadcast August 25, 1957, tells the story of the aborted 1822 rebellion.
 Vesey's life is retold in the radio drama "The Denmark Vesey Story", presented by Destination Freedom

Television
 Vesey was the subject of the 1982 made-for-television drama A House Divided: Denmark Vesey's Rebellion, in which he was played by actor Yaphet Kotto.
 Vesey was featured as a character in the TV movie Brother Future (1991).
 Several PBS documentaries have included material on Denmark Vesey, particularly Africans in America and This Far By Faith.
 A bar in the very first episode of Lovecraft Country is named Denmark Vessey [sic].
 In the television series Outer Banks, the character of Denmark Tanny is loosely based on Vesey.

Music
 Vesey was the subject of a 1939 opera named after him by novelist and composer Paul Bowles.
 Joe McPhee's composition "Message from Denmark", featured on the 1971 album Joe McPhee & Survival Unit II at WBAI's Free Music Store, refers not to the country, but to Vesey.
 Vesey is mentioned in underground hip-hop artist Apani B. Fly Emcee's song "Time Zone," featuring Talib Kweli. Kweli refers to both Nat Turner and Denmark Vesey by saying "Not separate or equal, so fuck Ferguson, and Plessy Folks of Slaves, bringin' it like Nat Turner and Denmark Vesey."
 In 2014, North Carolina native band Corrosion of Conformity included a song, "Denmark Vesey," on their album IX. Citing other well-known historical figures such as Nat Turner and John Brown in the lyrics, the song refers to the abolition of slavery in the South and the Charleston events of 1822.

See also
 List of slaves

References
Informational notes

Citations

Bibliography

Primary sources

 Bennett,  Thomas Jr. "Circular Letter", dated August 10, 1822, n.p. reprinted in National Intelligencer, August 24, 1822; and in Nile’s Weekly Register, September 7, 1822.
 Egerton, Douglas R., and Paquette, Robert L., eds. The Denmark Vesey Affair: A Documentary History, 2017. Gainesville: University Press of Florida. 
 Digital Library on American Slavery
 Hamilton, James. An Account of the Late Insurrection Among A Portion of the Blacks of this City. Charleston: A. E. Miller, 1822.  Also published as Negro Plot: An Account of the Late Insurrection Among A Portion of the Blacks of Charleston, South Carolina. Joseph Ingraham, Boston, 1822.  Available online at Documenting the American South, University of North Carolina.
 Kennedy, Lionel; Parker, Thomas. An Official Report of the Trials of Sundry Negroes Charged with an Attempt to Raise an Insurrection in the State of South Carolina, Preceded by an Introduction and Narrative and in an Appendix, a Report of the Trials of Four White Persons, on Indictments for Attempting to incite the Slaves to Insurrection. Prepared and published at the request of the Court. Charleston, 1822. Available online at the Library of Congress, American Memory.

Secondary sources
 
   Accessed 2017-03-23.
 Freehling, William W. “Denmark Vesey’s Peculiar Reality,” in Robert Abzug and Stephen Maizlish. New Perspectives in Race and Slavery:  Essays in Honor of Kenneth Stampp.  Lexington:  University of Kentucky Press, 1986.
 
 
 Johnson, Michael P., Douglas R. Egerton, Edward A. Pearson, David Robertson, Winthrop Jordan, et al. in “Forum: The Making of a Slave Conspiracy, Part 2”, William and Mary Quarterly, LViV, No. 1, (January 2002)
 Johnson, Michael P., and James L. Roark. Black Masters: A Free Family of Color in the Old South, W.W. Norton & Co. 1984, 
 Lofton, John. Insurrection in South Carolina: The Turbulent World of Denmark Vesey. Yellow Springs, Ohio:  The Antioch Press, 1964. Reissued 1983 as Denmark Vesey’s Revolt, Kent State University Press.
 Pearson, Edward A. editor. Designs against Charleston: The Trial Record of the Denmark Slave Conspiracy of 1822, University of North Carolina Press, 1999 
 Paquette, Robert L. "From Rebellion to Revisionism: The Continuing Debate About the Denmark Vesey Affair", Journal of the Historical Society, IV (Fall 2004), 291–334, .
 Powers, Bernard E., Jr. Black Charlestonians: A Social History, 1822–1882, University of Arkansas Press, 1994, 
 Robertson, David., Denmark Vesey: The Buried History of America's Largest Slave Rebellion and the Man Who Led It, New York: Knopf, 1999
 Rubio, Philip F. "Though He Had a White Face, He Was a Negro in Heart": Examining the White Men Convicted of Supporting the 1822 Denmark Vesey Slave Insurrection Conspiracy", South Carolina Historical Magazine 113, no. 1 (January 2012): 50–67. America: History & Life, EBSCOhost (accessed October 16, 2014), via JSTOR.
 Rucker, Walter G., The River Flows On: Black Resistance, Culture, and Identity Formation in Early America, LSU Press, 2006, 
 Spady, James O'Neil, "Power and Confession: On the Credibility of the Earliest Reports of the Denmark Vesey Slave Conspiracy,” William and Mary Quarterly, 3rd. ser., 68 (April 2011), 287–304.
 
 
 van Daacke, Kirt. Denmark Vesey. Teachinghistory.org. Accessed June 2, 2011.
 
 "Executions in the U.S. 1608–1987: The Espy File" (by state)

Further reading
 Killens, John Oliver (1972) Great Gittin' Up Morning: A Biography of Denmark Vesey . Long Island City: Doubleday. 

1767 births
1822 deaths
19th-century executions by the United States
American people of Akan descent
American people of Ghanaian descent
American people of United States Virgin Islands descent
Methodists from South Carolina
American rebel slaves
Conflicts in 1822
Executed Bermudian people
South Carolina colonial people
United States Virgin Islands Methodists
Slave rebellions in the United States
People executed by South Carolina by hanging
19th-century executions of American people
Executed African-American people
18th-century American slaves
African-American history of South Carolina
1822 crimes in the United States
19th-century American slaves
Literate American slaves
American revolutionaries